Ľubovec is a village and municipality in Prešov District in the Prešov Region of eastern Slovakia.

History
In historical records the village was first mentioned in 1285.

Geography
The municipality lies at an altitude of 277 metres and covers an area of 8.277 km2. It has a population of about 503 people.

External links
 
 
http://www.statistics.sk/mosmis/eng/run.html

Villages and municipalities in Prešov District
Šariš